is a Japanese manga series by Hiroshi Motomiya. It was serialized in Shueisha's seinen manga magazine Weekly Young Jump from 1994 to 2002, with many periods of inactivity during its run. Salary Man Kintaro had sold over 30 million copies in print.

The manga follows Kintaro Yajima, a former bōsōzoku leader who, as a promise to his late wife, has become a salaryman. In 2005, Kintaro went from working as a salaryman to working for a foreign bank.

In 2005, Salary Man Kintaro began appearing as an online comic and eventually returned to Young Jump.

While the manga is not available in print in English, all 30 volumes and part of the sequel had been translated into English and were available through the Comic Friends Facebook app. However, in December 2018 Comic Friends announced that it would no longer be doing business in America. In July 2020, manga subscription service Manga Planet had announced that they had licensed the manga.

Characters

 The protagonist of the series, a high school dropout and former bōsōzoku who retired to become a fisherman, but after he saved Morinosuke Yamato he was offered a job at Yamato Construction in the sales department.

 Née . A high class woman who once had an affair with the late politician . She still has strong political and financial connections and later becomes Kintaro's wife.

 The son of Kintaro and his late wife Akemi.

 The daughter of Misuzu from her affair with Kuroda.

 Kintaro's first wife, a kind blind woman who dies giving birth to Ryuta.

 One of the many men that Kintaro saves. Chairman of Yamato Construction. He believes in Kintaro all the way.

Media

Live-action film

Live-action TV series
 Seasons
 January 10 – March 21, 1999: Salary Man Kintaro (11 episodes, average rating: 19.0%)
 October 3, 1999: Salary Man Kintaro Special
 April 9 – July 2, 2000: Salary Man Kintaro 2 (12 episodes, average rating: 16.3%)
 January 6 – March 17, 2002: Salary Man Kintaro 3 (11 episodes, average rating: 15.5%)
 January 15 – March 18, 2004: Salary Man Kintaro 4 (10 episodes, average rating: 11.2%)

 Cast
The main cast from the film version returned for the television series.

 Theme songs
 Season 1:  (The Alfee)
 Season 2:  (Tetsurō Oda)
 Season 3:  (Katsunori Takahashi)
 Season 4:  (The Alfee)

Anime television series
 Cast
 Kintaro Yajima: Taisei Miyamoto
 Misuzu Suenaga: Atsuko Tanaka
 Mimi Suenaga: Ryōka Yuzuki
 Morinosuke Yamato: Kiyoshi Kawakuba
 Genzo Oshima: Takeshi Watabe
 Yusaku Kurokawa: Nachi Nozawa
 Ryuzo Igo: Kōsei Tomita
 Kayo Nakamura: Seiko Tomoe
 Ichiro Maeda: Kōichi Nagano
 Masakazu Tanaka: Tomoyuki Kōno
 Hiroshi Kaminaga: Katsuhisa Hōki
 Takashi Shiina: Kunihiko Yasui
 Mamoru Mizuki: Nobuaki Sekine
 Kyoko Sakurai: Masako Katsuki

Theme songs
 Opening Theme:  (Yumi Matsuzawa)
 Ending Theme:  (Norishige Takahashi)

The anime was available subtitled on DVD through Arts Magic.

References

External links

Salaryman Kintarou 2
Salaryman Kintarou 3
Salaryman Kintarou 4
Salaryman Kintarou（TBS Drama Archive）
Salaryman Kintarou 2（TBS Drama Archive）

1994 manga
1999 Japanese television series debuts
2001 anime television series debuts
Business in anime and manga
Films directed by Takashi Miike
Japanese drama television series
Manga adapted into films
Nichiyō Gekijō
Seinen manga
Shueisha manga
Shueisha franchises
TBS Television (Japan) dramas